Plšek (feminine Plšková) is a Czech surname. Notable people with the surname include:

 Jakub Plšek (born 1993), Czech footballer
 Lukáš Plšek (born 1983), Czech ice hockey player
 Ondřej Plšek (born 1981), Czech darts player

Czech-language surnames